Danny Sérgio Guissoni (born 21 March 1978), known as Danny Sérgio, is a Brazilian football coach, currently employed at Vila Nova.

Career
Born in Goiânia, Goiás, Danny Sérgio began his career as a fitness coach, joining Goiás in the 2000s. On 19 October 2015, after the dismissal of Arthur Neto, he was appointed manager of the main squad until the end of the campaign. For the 2016 season, he was named an assistant of Enderson Moreira, being also an interim for one Série B match in June.

On 11 February 2022, after 18 years at Goiás, Danny Sérgio was appointed fitness coach at Vila Nova.

References

External links
Futebol de Goyaz profile 

1978 births
Living people
Sportspeople from Goiânia
Brazilian football managers
Campeonato Brasileiro Série A managers
Goiás Esporte Clube managers